Jamahal Hill (born May 19, 1991) is an American professional mixed martial artist. He currently competes in the Light Heavyweight division of the Ultimate Fighting Championship (UFC), where he is the current UFC Light Heavyweight Champion. As of January 24, 2023, he is #13 in the UFC men's pound-for-pound rankings.

Background

Hill moved to Grand Rapids when he was 12. He graduated from Rogers High School in Wyoming, Michigan. After passing on a basketball career at Davenport University, Hill started competing in professional mixed martial arts in 2017.

Mixed martial arts career

Early career
Starting his career in 2017, Hill started his professional career 5–0, four of the five fights coming under the KnockOut Promotions banner. In just his fourth professional fight Hill defeated future UFC fighter Dequan Townsend despite Townsend having twenty-six pro appearances prior to that bout.

Hill then received the call to appear on Dana White's Contender Series 21 back in 2019, where Hill defeated opponent Alexander Poppeck via second-round ground and pound, earning his UFC contract.

Ultimate Fighting Championship

Hill made his UFC debut against Darko Stošić on January 25, 2020 at UFC Fight Night 166. He won the fight via unanimous decision.

Hill faced Klidson Abreu on May 30, 2020 at UFC on ESPN: Woodley vs. Burns. He initially won the fight via technical knockout in the first round, but the fight was later overturned on September 3 because Hill tested positive for marijuana. He was suspended six months and fined 15% of his fight purse.

Hill faced Ovince Saint Preux on December 5, 2020 at UFC on ESPN 19. At the weigh-ins, former interim UFC Light Heavyweight Championship challenger Ovince Saint Preux weighed in at 207.5 pounds, one and a half pounds over the light heavyweight non-title fight limit. The bout proceeded at a catchweight and Saint Preux was fined 20% of his individual purse, which went to Hill. Hill won the fight via technical knockout in the second round.

Hill was scheduled to face Paul Craig on March 20, 2021 UFC on ESPN 21. However on March 10, Hill withdrew from the bout after testing positive for COVID-19. The pairing with Craig remained intact and took place on June 12, 2021 at UFC 263. After having his elbow dislocated early in the fight via an armbar from Craig, Hill lost the fight via technical knockout in the first round.

Hill was scheduled to face Jimmy Crute on October 2, 2021 UFC Fight Night 193. However in early September, the bout was rescheduled two months later at UFC on ESPN: Font vs. Aldo. He won the fight via knockout in the first round. This win earned him the Performance of the Night award.

In his first UFC main event, Hill faced Johnny Walker on February 19, 2022 at UFC Fight Night: Walker vs. Hill. He won the fight via knockout in the first round. The win earned Hill his second Performance of the Night bonus award.

Hill faced Thiago Santos on August 6, 2022 at UFC on ESPN 40. He won the fight via technical knockout. This fight earned him the Fight of the Night award.

Hill was scheduled to face Anthony Smith on March 11, 2023, at UFC Fight Night 221. However, Hill was pulled from the bout after being rebooked to headline UFC 283 for the vacant UFC Light Heavyweight Championship against Glover Teixeira on January 21, 2023. He won the bout and title via unanimous decision, and in the process became the first Dana White's Contender Series alumn to win a UFC championship. This fight earned him the Fight of the Night award.

Personal life
Hill has six children, who range in age from 2 to 14 years old, as of June 2021.

Championships and accomplishments
Ultimate Fighting Championship
UFC Light Heavyweight Championship (One time; current)
The first Dana White's Contender Series alum to become an undisputed UFC champion
Performance of the Night (Two times) 
Most significant strikes landed in a fight in UFC Light Heavyweight division history (232) vs. Glover Teixeira
Most significant strikes attempted in a fight in UFC Light Heavyweight division history (402) vs. Glover Teixeira
Fight of the Night (Two times) 
KnockOut Promotions 
KOP Light Heavyweight Championship (One time)
MMAjunkie.com
2022 February Knockout of the Month vs. Johnny Walker
2023 January Fight of the Month

Mixed martial arts record

|-
|
|align=center|12–1 (1)
|Glover Teixeira
|Decision (unanimous)
|UFC 283
|
|align=center|5
|align=center|5:00
|Rio de Janeiro, Brazil
|
|-
|
|align=center|11–1 (1)
|Thiago Santos
|TKO (punches and elbows)
|UFC on ESPN: Santos vs. Hill
|
|align=center|4
|align=center|2:31
|Las Vegas, Nevada, United States
|
|-
|Win
| style="text-align:center" |
|Johnny Walker
|KO (punch)
|UFC Fight Night: Walker vs. Hill
|
| style="text-align:center" | 1
| style="text-align:center" | 2:55
|Las Vegas, Nevada, United States
|
|-
|Win
| style="text-align:center" | 9–1 (1) 
|Jimmy Crute
|KO (punches)
|UFC on ESPN: Font vs. Aldo 
|
| style="text-align:center" | 1
| style="text-align:center" | 0:48
|Las Vegas, Nevada, United States
|
|-
|Loss
| style="text-align:center" | 8–1 (1) 
|Paul Craig
|TKO (elbows and punches)
|UFC 263
|
| style="text-align:center" | 1
| style="text-align:center" | 1:59
|Glendale, Arizona, United States
|
|-
|Win
| style="text-align:center" | 8–0 (1) 
|Ovince Saint Preux
|TKO (punches) 
|UFC on ESPN: Hermansson vs. Vettori
|
| style="text-align:center" | 2
| style="text-align:center" | 3:37
|Las Vegas, Nevada, United States
|
|-
|NC
| style="text-align:center" | 7–0 (1) 
|Klidson Abreu
|NC (overturned)
|UFC on ESPN: Woodley vs. Burns
|
| style="text-align:center" | 1
| style="text-align:center" | 1:51
|Las Vegas, Nevada, United States
|
|-
|Win
| style="text-align:center" |  7–0
|Darko Stošić
|Decision (unanimous)
|UFC Fight Night: Blaydes vs. dos Santos 
|
| style="text-align:center" | 3
| style="text-align:center" | 5:00
|Raleigh, North Carolina, United States
| 
|-
| Win
| style="text-align:center" | 6–0
| Alexander Poppeck
| TKO (punches and elbows)
| Dana White's Contender Series 21
| 
| style="text-align:center" | 3
| style="text-align:center" | 0:22
| Las Vegas, Nevada, United States
| 
|-
| Win
| style="text-align:center" | 5–0
| William Vincent
| TKO (retirement)
| Lights Out Championship 2
| 
| style="text-align:center" | 1
| style="text-align:center" | 5:00
| Grand Rapids, Michigan, United States
| 
|-
| Win
| style="text-align:center" | 4–0
| Dequan Townsend
|Decision (unanimous)
|KnockOut Promotions 62
|
| style="text-align:center" | 5
| style="text-align:center" | 5:00
|Grand Rapids, Michigan, United States
|
|-
| Win
| style="text-align:center" | 3–0
| William Vincent
| Decision (unanimous)
| KnockOut Promotions 61
| 
| style="text-align:center" | 3
| style="text-align:center" | 5:00
|Grand Rapids, Michigan, United States
| 
|-
| Win
| style="text-align:center" | 2–0
| Mike Johnson
| TKO (punches)
| KnockOut Promotions 59
| 
| style="text-align:center" | 1
| style="text-align:center" | 4:45
|Grand Rapids, Michigan, United States
|
|-
| Win
| style="text-align:center" | 1–0
| Alex Davidson
| Decision (unanimous)
| KnockOut Promotions 58
| 
| style="text-align:center" | 3
| style="text-align:center" | 5:00
|Grand Rapids, Michigan, United States
|

See also 
 List of current UFC fighters
 List of male mixed martial artists

References

External links 
  
 

1991 births
Living people
American male mixed martial artists
Light heavyweight mixed martial artists
Mixed martial artists utilizing Brazilian jiu-jitsu
Ultimate Fighting Championship male fighters
American practitioners of Brazilian jiu-jitsu